The Iraq national futsal team represents Iraq in international futsal competitions and is controlled by the Futsal Commission of the Iraq Football Association. It is one of the rising teams in Asia. , Iraq is ranked 50th in the Futsal World Rankings.
Iraq has played in eleven AFC Futsal Championships. Its best result was fourth place in 2018. Iraq has also played at three WAFF Futsal Championships where in 2009, they won the tournament to gain their first ever title on any international stage. Iraq also played three times at the Arab Futsal Cup, finishing as runners-up in the 2022 edition.

Team image

Home stadium
Iraq plays the home games at the Baghdad Gymnasium with a capacity of 3,000 spectators. The complex was designed by the Swiss-French architect Charles-Édouard Jeanneret, commonly known as Le Corbusier.

Recent results and fixtures

Previous matches

Coaching staff
As of 21 June 2022

Players

Current squad
Players called for the 2022 AFC Futsal Asian Cup.

Previous squads

AFC Futsal Championship
2018 AFC Futsal Championship squads

Tournament records

FIFA Futsal World Cup

AFC Futsal Asian Cup

Futsal at the Asian Indoor and Martial Arts Games

WAFF Futsal Championship

Arab Futsal Championship

See also
Iraq national football team
Iraq national beach soccer team

External links
Official website

References

 

Asian national futsal teams
Futsal
National